Sedition Hunters is an online community of open-source intelligence (OSINT) investigators that are trying to identify the people who took part in the 2021 United States Capitol attack. They use FBI footage and use online media on sites like Twitter, Parler, video platforms, and other social media to identify the suspects. Due to the volume of suspects, the FBI has relied on groups like the Sedition Hunters.

References

External links 
 

Aftermath of the January 6 United States Capitol attack
Virtual communities